Most of the visitors to Northern Cyprus do not need to obtain a visa in advance for short visits.

Visa policy

Citizens of all countries may enter without a visa for up to 90 days except for the citizens of the following countries:

They must obtain a visa at one of the diplomatic missions of Northern Cyprus.

Visa on arrival was issued when crossing from the Republic of Cyprus until May 2015.

Visitors given less than 90 days on entry but wishing to stay longer (up to 90 days) can apply for extension at the Immigration Department of the Police Headquarters. To stay longer than 90 days, they have to exit and re-enter the country. Overstayers will be issued a visa penalty fine (100.23 Turkish lira for each day) that has to be paid on a future re-entry.

Passport exemption

For visits of up to 90 days (i.e. without obtaining a work or residence permit), citizens of
 Turkey
 European Union 
 EFTA

may enter the TRNC using national ID cards (incl Irish passport card) instead of a passport.

See also

 Visa requirements for Northern Cypriot citizens
 Visa policy of Turkey
 Visa policy of the Schengen Area

References

External links
VISA Regulations, Turkish Republic of Northern Cyprus, Ministry of Foreign Affairs

Northern Cyprus
Foreign relations of Northern Cyprus